Aviva Investors is an asset management company and is part of the Aviva group.

History
The London unit, previously known as Morley, was founded in 1971 as Geoffrey Morley and Partners. This was bought by Globe Investment in 1988 and then sold to Commercial Union, before being absorbed into CGU and then Aviva plc.

The Central Bank of Ireland fined Aviva Investors in July 2011 for failing to have proper controls and procedures surrounding the safeguarding of client assets.

The company has made significant investments in biomass and wind energy. Some of the investments in biomass have attracted local and national opposition, due to the increase in pollution and the contributions to fossil fuels.

In September 2021, Aviva Investors signed a long-term lease deal with Netflix to operate and expand the Longcross Studios.

Notes and references

External links 
Official Aviva Investors website

1971 establishments in England
Investors
Financial services companies established in 1971
British companies established in 1971
Investment management companies of the United Kingdom
Financial services companies based in the City of London